Rajinder Johar is a philanthropist with quadriplegia who runs an NGO by the name Family of Disabled (FoD) which looks after the betterment of disabled persons in Delhi in more ways than one. As a result of a bullet injury in 1986 in an attempted robbery in his house, Johar was left paralyzed with limited mobility. After six years of depression, he decided to help disabled people become self-sufficient and thus founded the Family of Disabled. Johar's service of disabled people over two decades has won him several awards and accolades.

Family of Disabled (FOD) was founded in 1992 by Johar, himself a quadriplegic who has been bedridden for the last 22 years. Based in New Delhi, FOD's mission is to build and nurture the capacities of persons with disabilities through different sustainable interventions for improving their quality of life, making them self-reliant and facilitating their mainstreaming

References

1948 births
Activists from Punjab, India
Living people
Indian disability rights activists
Indian people with disabilities
People with tetraplegia
People from Jalandhar